Michael or Mike George may refer to:
 Michael George (footballer), Australian rules footballer
 Michael J. George, member of the Minnesota House of Representatives
 Mike George (radio presenter), British radio presenter
 Mike George (wrestler), American professional wrestler
 Michael Carl George, American murderer